The Business Risk Mitigation and Price Stabilization Act of 2013 is a bill that passed the United States House of Representatives during the 113th United States Congress.  The bill would exempt nonfinancial entities that enter into a swap or a security-based swap transaction from meeting certain margin requirements when the transaction is designed to offset losses or gains in other investments.

Provisions/elements of the bill

H.R. 634 would exempt nonfinancial entities that enter into a swap or a security-based swap transaction from meeting certain margin requirements when the transaction is designed to offset losses or gains in other investments. (A swap is a contract that calls for an exchange of cash between two participants, based on an underlying rate or index or on the performance of an asset.)

Both the Commodity Futures Trading Commission (CFTC) and the Securities and Exchange Commission (SEC) are developing regulations relating to margin requirements (minimum amounts of collateral that must be deposited, often with a broker or exchange, to cover some or all of the risk of a counterparty) in swap transactions as the result of the enactment of the Dodd-Frank Wall Street Reform and Consumer Protection Act. In addition, other financial regulators, including the Federal Reserve System, the Office of the Comptroller of the Currency (OCC), and the Federal Deposit Insurance Corporation (FDIC) among others, are also developing margin requirements that would apply to the entities they regulate. Final regulations have not been completed by any agency.

Based on information from several of the affected agencies, the Congressional Budget Office has reported that it expects that incorporating the provisions of H.R. 634 at this point in the regulatory process would not require a significant increase in the workload of any agency. CBO estimates that any change in discretionary spending by the SEC and CFTC to implement the legislation would not be significant. Further, under current law, the SEC is authorized to collect fees sufficient to offset its appropriation each year. Therefore, the CBO estimates that the net cost to the SEC would be negligible, assuming appropriation actions consistent with that authority.

The Business Risk Mitigation and Price Stabilization Act of 2013 would amend the Commodity Exchange Act (CEA) and the Securities Exchange Act of 1934.

Procedural history

House
The Business Risk Mitigation and Price Stabilization Act of 2013 was introduced by Rep. Michael Grimm (R-NY) on February 13, 2013.  It was referred to four committees in the House: the United States House Committee on Agriculture, the United States House Agriculture Subcommittee on General Farm Commodities and Risk Management, the United States House Committee on Financial Services, and the United States House Financial Services Subcommittee on Capital Markets and Government-Sponsored Enterprises.  On June 12, 2013, the bill passed the House in Roll Call Vote 215: 411-12.

Senate
The Business Risk Mitigation and Price Stabilization Act of 2013 was received in the Senate on June 13, 2013 and referred to the United States Senate Committee on Banking, Housing, and Urban Affairs.

See also
List of bills in the 113th United States Congress
Financial regulation
Commodity Futures Trading Commission (CFTC)
U.S. Securities and Exchange Commission (SEC)
Dodd-Frank Wall Street Reform and Consumer Protection Act
Federal Reserve System
Office of the Comptroller of the Currency (OCC)
Federal Deposit Insurance Corporation

Notes/References

External links

Library of Congress - Thomas H.R. 634
beta.congress.gov H.R. 634
GovTrack.us H.R. 634
OpenCongress.org H.R. 634
WashingtonWatch.com H.R. 634
Congressional Budget Office's Report on H.R. 634
House Republicans' report on H.R. 634

Proposed legislation of the 113th United States Congress